Karl Rudolf Õigus (born 5 November 1998) is an Estonian footballer who plays as a forward for Kuressaare and the Estonia national team.

Club career
On 3 February 2023 he signed Kuressaare.

International career
Õigus made his international debut for Estonia on 24 March 2021 in a 2022 FIFA World Cup qualification match against the Czech Republic.

Career statistics

International

References

External links
 
 
 

1998 births
Living people
Sportspeople from Tartu
Estonian footballers
Estonia under-21 international footballers
Estonia international footballers
Association football forwards
FCI Levadia Tallinn players
Meistriliiga players
Esiliiga players